Eligio is an Italian, Portuguese and Spanish given name. Eligiusz in Polish. Notable people with the name include:

Given names
Eligio Ancona (1835–1893), Mexican politician
Eligio Ayala (1879–1930), former president of Paraguay
Eligio Caracciolo (1654–1700), Italian Roman Catholic prelate
Eligio Cedeño (born 1964), Venezuelan banker
Eligio Cervantes (born 1974), Mexican athlete
Eligio Echagüe (1938–2009), Paraguayan footballer
Eligio González Farías (born 1977), Mexican politician
Eligio de la Garza II (1927–2017), American politician
Eligio Insfrán (born 1935), Paraguayan footballer
Eligio Lofranco (born 1943), Filipino lawyer
Eligio Martínez (born 1955), Bolivian footballer
Eligio Esquivel Méndez (1908–1964), Mexican politician and engineer
Eligio Sardiñas Montalvo (1910–1988), Cuban boxer
Eligio Perucca (1890–1965), Italian physics instructor and researcher
Eligio Pichardo (1929–1984), painter from the Dominican Republic
Eligio de la Puente (1724–1781), Spanish Floridian
Eligio Valentino (1925–2012), Italian sprint canoer
Eligio Vecchi (1910–1968), Italian footballer
Eligiusz Gwoździński (1927–2005), Polish footballer 
Eligiusz Niewiadomski (1869–1923), Polish painter

Middle names
Luis Eligio Tapia (born 1950), American artist

Churches
Sant'Eligio dei Chiavettieri, a church in Naples, Italy
Sant'Eligio Maggiore, a church in Naples, Italy
Sant'Eligio degli Orefici, a church in Rome, Italy

Masculine given names
Italian masculine given names
Portuguese masculine given names
Spanish masculine given names